Never Better is the third solo studio album by American rapper P.O.S. It was released on Rhymesayers Entertainment in 2009. It peaked at number 106 on the Billboard 200 chart.

Production
Over half of the record is produced by P.O.S himself, along with contributions from Doomtree producers Lazerbeak, Paper Tiger and MK Larada. It features guest verses from Doomtree compatriots Sims, Cecil Otter and Dessa, as well as Astronautalis.

Release
The first single "Goodbye" was released in December, 2008. The second single "Drumroll (We're All Thirsty)" was released in January, 2009 on iTunes and Amazon.com. The track "Savion Glover" is a remix of a track previously released on Doomtree's False Hopes in 2007.

The album was released in a limited custom transparent digipak edition designed by Minneapolis designer Eric Carlson. It features 16 solid picture inserts with 6 plastic overlays, allowing the owner to create their own cover art combinations.

Critical reception

At Metacritic, which assigns a weighted average score out of 100 to reviews from mainstream critics, the album received an average score of 75, based on 8 reviews, indicating "generally favorable reviews".

Many reviewers on RapReviews.com placed this album in their top ten list for 2009, with it even claiming the number one spot in a few.

Track listing

Personnel
Credits adapted from liner notes.

 P.O.S – vocals, guitar, bass guitar, keyboards, organ, production (2, 3, 7, 10, 11, 12, 13, 14, 16, 17)
 Matt Scharenbroich – drums (1)
 Lazerbeak – production (1, 4, 5, 6, 8), vocals (2), piano (5, 6), keyboards (5), organ (6)
 Eric Timothy Carlson – vocals (2), artwork
 Glorily Velez – vocals (2)
 Joel Anderson – vocals (2)
 Julie Kravitz – vocals (2)
 Ruben Vela II – vocals (2)
 Ryan Cybul – vocals (2)
 The Bled – vocals (2)
 Mike the 2600 King – turntables (3)
 Turbo Nemesis – turntables (7)
 Jessy Greene – violin (7)
 Paper Tiger – production (9)
 Dessa – vocals (9)
 Sims – vocals (9)
 Cecil Otter – vocals (9)
 F.Stokes – vocals (10)
 Maria Juranic – handclaps (12)
 Jason Shevchuk – vocals (13)
 Judah Nagler – vocals (14)
 MK Larada – production (15)
 Astronautalis – vocals (16)
 Maggie Morrison – vocals (17)
 Joe Mabbott – engineering, mixing
 B. Sayers – executive production
 S. Daley – executive production
 S. Alexander – executive production
 Chris Gehringer – mastering
 Adam Garcia – photography
 Brian Lesterberg – photography
 Dan Monick – photography
 Julien Murray – photography

Charts

References

External links
 
 Never Better at Bandcamp

2009 albums
P.O.S albums
Rhymesayers Entertainment albums
Albums produced by Lazerbeak